Sir Joseph Herbert Cunliffe,  (1 July 1867 – 9 April 1963) was a British barrister and Conservative Party politician.

Cunliffe was called to the bar in 1896 and took silk in 1912. He was a Member of Parliament (MP) for Bolton, a two-member constituency, from 1923 to 1929.

He was Attorney-General of the Duchy of Lancaster from 1921 to 1946. From 1932 to 1946 he was Chairman of the General Council of the Bar.

He was appointed a knight bachelor in the 1926 New Year Honours List. In 1946 he was appointed KBE.

Arms

References 

Conservative Party (UK) MPs for English constituencies
People from Bolton
UK MPs 1923–1924
UK MPs 1924–1929
Attorneys-General of the Duchy of Lancaster
Knights Bachelor
1867 births
1963 deaths
Members of Lincoln's Inn
English barristers
English King's Counsel
20th-century King's Counsel
Knights Commander of the Order of the British Empire